Timroy Patrick Allen (born 22 January 1987) is a Jamaican born American cricketer. Allen currently represents the United States national cricket team.  Allen made his List-A debut for the United States against Barbados in the 2008/09 West Indies Cricket Board Cup. Allen made two further appearances for the United States in that tournament against Trinidad and Tobago and the Combined Campuses and Colleges. The United States lost all three matches.

Later in 2008 Allen represented the United States in the 2008 ICC Americas Championship Division One, where he played three matches against Suriname, Argentina and the Cayman Islands, as the United States went on to win the tournament.

In 2010 he made his unofficial Twenty20 debut for the United States against the UAE in a pre-tournament warm up match for the 2010 ICC World Twenty20 Qualifier. During the tournament Allen made his full Twenty20 debut against Scotland, where the USA went on to win by 6 wickets. He followed this up by playing matches against Ireland and Afghanistan, both of which the United States lost.

Later in February 2010, Allen represented the United States in the 2010 ICC World Cricket League Division Five, where he helped the United States gained promotion to the 2010 ICC World Cricket League Division Four in Italy.

Allen was selected for the 2016 Caribbean Premier League by the Jamaica Tallawahs, which represented a return of sorts to his home country. This was part of an initiative to spread the popularity of cricket to the American nations, and he played six games for the team that season. He was subsequently retained for the next year's competition.

In June 2019, he was named in a 30-man training squad for the United States cricket team, ahead of the Regional Finals of the 2018–19 ICC T20 World Cup Americas Qualifier tournament in Bermuda. The following month, he was one of twelve players to sign a three-month central contract with USA Cricket. In August 2019, he was named in the United States' squad for the Regional Finals of the 2018–19 ICC T20 World Cup Americas Qualifier tournament. He made his Twenty20 International (T20I) debut for the United States against Bermuda on 18 August 2019.

In June 2021, he was selected to take part in the Minor League Cricket tournament in the United States following the players' draft.

References

External links
Timroy Allen at Cricinfo
Timroy Allen at CricketArchive

1987 births
Living people
People from Westmoreland Parish
American cricketers
Jamaican emigrants to the United States
American sportspeople of Jamaican descent
Jamaica Tallawahs cricketers
Jamaican cricketers
ICC Americas cricketers
United States Twenty20 International cricketers